Galust Petrosyan (born on 5 September 1981 in Yerevan, Armenian SSR) is a retired Armenian football forward. He was a member of the Armenia national football team, with 7 caps and 1 goal scored.

National team statistics

References

External links
 
 
 

Living people
1981 births
Footballers from Yerevan
Armenian footballers
Armenia international footballers
Armenian expatriate footballers
Expatriate footballers in Moldova
Expatriate footballers in Belarus
Expatriate footballers in Iran
Armenian expatriate sportspeople in Moldova
Armenian Premier League players
FC Ararat Yerevan players
FC Pyunik players
FC Zimbru Chișinău players
FC Smorgon players
Sanati Kaveh players
Mes Sarcheshme players
Ulisses FC players
Association football forwards